Michael Aksel Bataican Falkesgaard (born 9 April 1991) is a professional footballer who plays as a goalkeeper for Thai League 1 club Bangkok United. Born in Denmark, he represents the Philippines national team. Born in Denmark to a Danish father and a Filipino mother, Falkesgaard represented Denmark at the youth levels and then decided to represent the Philippines at the senior level.

Early life
Falkesgaard was born in Denmark to a Danish father and a Filipino mother. He was influenced by his father and elder brother to take up football. When he was five years old, he asked his father to take him to the youth academy of the local club Kastrup BK. He stated that his football role model was fellow Danish goalkeeper Peter Schmeichel.

Club career

Denmark
Falkesgaard started his senior club career with Brøndby IF in 2010. In 2015, he moved to Odense Boldklub where he was the first-choice goalkeeper. However, a few matches into the season, he suffered a serious ACL injury that required surgery. He returned from injury and later joined rival club FC Midtjylland, but he was not able to play a single match for them.

Bangkok United
In January 2018, Falkesgaard was sold by Midtjylland to Thai League 1 club Bangkok United, where he is counted as an ASEAN player. Falkesgaard kept eleven clean sheets in his first season with Bangkok United, helping his club finish as runners-up in 2018.

International career

Denmark youth
Falkesgaard has represented Denmark at under-18 to under-20 levels.

Philippines
Born to a Filipino mother, Falkesgaard was eligible to represent the Philippines.  The Philippine Football Federation learned of his eligibility through Dennis Cagara and Jerry Lucena, both of whom are also Danish-Filipino footballers capped for the Philippines.

In March 2018, Falkesgaard received his first call up for the Philippines. He earned his first cap on 22 March in a 3–2 friendly win over Fiji. He did not concede any goal in the first half; however, Nick O'Donnell was subbed in for him at the start of the second half. On 13 October, he came on as a second half substitute for Neil Etheridge in a 1–1 friendly draw against Oman.

Falkesgaard was named in the Philippines' 23-man squad for the 2018 AFF Championship. He started in the group matches against Timor-Leste, Thailand, and Indonesia. He then played in the first leg of the semi-finals against Vietnam, but missed the second leg due to a groin injury. Philippines lost to Vietnam on 4–2 aggregate.

Since Neil Etheridge was unavailable due to club commitments, Falkesgaard was named Philippines' first-choice goalkeeper for the 2019 AFC Asian Cup—the first time the national team has qualified for the international tournament. Philippines exited the tournament at the group stage after a winless campaign.

Career statistics

Club

International

Notes

References

External links
 
 
 
 Michael Falkesgaard DBU-statistics
 

1991 births
Living people
Citizens of the Philippines through descent
Danish people of Filipino descent
Filipino people of Danish descent
Filipino footballers
Philippines international footballers
Danish men's footballers
Denmark youth international footballers
Danish Superliga players
Brøndby IF players
Odense Boldklub players
FC Midtjylland players
Association football goalkeepers
2019 AFC Asian Cup players
People from Tårnby Municipality
Sportspeople from the Capital Region of Denmark